Skyridge High School is a high school in Lehi, Utah, United States. The school opened in August 2016.
Skyridge High's mascot is a falcon named Flash, and their colors are burnt orange and steel gray.

History 
Skyridge was funded as a part of a bond for Alpine School District in 2011. The groundbreaking for the school was in 2014.

The school received a grant in 2015 to build a driver's education range.

Athletics 

Skyridge competes in Region 4 of classification 6A under the Utah High School Activities Association. The school participates in the following sports:

Baseball (boys)
Basketball (girls & boys)
Competitive Cheer (girls & boys)
Cross Country (girls & boys)
Drill Team (girls)
Football (boys)
Marching Band
Golf (girls & boys)
Lacrosse (girls & boys)
Softball (girls)
Soccer (girls & boys)
Swimming (girls & boys)
Tennis (girls & boys)
Track & Field (girls & boys)
Volleyball (girls)
Wrestling (girls & boys)

The school has won State Championships in the following sports:

Boys Cross Country (2020)

Football (2022)

Girls Tennis (2020, 2021, 2022)

Volleyball (2018)

Controversy 
In 2021 it was reported that a Black Female student at Skyridge High School had encountered several racist incidents at the school with white boys. It was reported that "The boys have called her the N-word, make fun of her body, and make fun of Black people not having fathers.” 

In 2020 two Skyridge football players faced juvenile charges after assaulting another student and posting a video of the incident on their social media. 

In 2018 former teacher Chelsea Cook was accused of murdering her ex-husband’s girlfriend, she was immediately terminated by the school district. Eventually Cook was sentenced to 34 years to life in prison.

See also 
List of high schools in Utah

References

External links 
 

Schools in Utah County, Utah
Lehi, Utah
Public high schools in Utah
Educational institutions established in 2016
2016 establishments in Utah